Jon S. Baird (born 9 November 1972) is a BAFTA winning Scottish film director. Born and raised in Aberdeenshire, he began his career at BBC Television.

Education 
Baird studied at the University of Aberdeen in the 1990s, where he graduated with an MA in Politics and International Relations.

Career
Baird's highly acclaimed feature Filth (2013), which he also wrote, directed and produced, was based on the best-selling novel of the same name by Irvine Welsh and starred James McAvoy. Filth won numerous awards and played at several international film festivals. Filth is in the top ten highest grossing UK 18-certificated films of all time.

In 2014, Baird directed the television drama Babylon for Channel 4, which was produced by Academy Award Winner Danny Boyle. Baird was approached by HBO in 2015 to direct an episode of their Martin Scorsese and Mick Jagger-produced show Vinyl, created by Terence Winter.

In 2016, he directed the second episode of I'm Dying Up Here for Showtime, produced by Jim Carrey.

In 2018, Baird directed, for eOne and BBC Films, Stan & Ollie, a feature film about comedy legends Laurel and Hardy, starring Steve Coogan and John C. Reilly.

In 2020, Jon S. Baird directed Tetris, a feature film produced by Matthew Vaughn and distributed by Apple TV+. The film delves into the legal conflicts surrounding the release of the video game of the same name. In addition to filming taking place in Glasgow, Baird's home region Aberdeenshire served as a location for the film in February 2021, with scenes being shot at the University of Aberdeen and in Aberdeen. Baird described the experience as "a dream come true" and hoped that it would kickstart further interest in the region as a filming location.

In 2022 Baird directed Stonehouse, a three-part docudrama starring Matthew Macfadyen as the disgraced British MP John Stonehouse, who infamously faked his own death in 1974.

Filmography 
Short film

Feature film

Television

Associate producer

Awards and nominations
 Winner of Breakthrough British Filmmaker (London Critics Circle)
 Nomination for Best British Film (London Critics Circle)
 Best Screenplay Nomination (Writers' Guild of Great Britain)
 Best Director and Best Film Nominations (BAFTA Scotland)
 Best Director Nomination (British Independent Film Awards)
 Best British Film Nomination (Empire Film Awards)
 Winner of BAFTA Scotland best director for Stan & Ollie

References

External links 

1972 births
Living people
Alumni of the University of Aberdeen
BBC people
People from Peterhead
Scottish film directors
Scottish television directors